Chloroclystis senex is a moth in the family Geometridae. It is found in the Democratic Republic of Congo and Uganda.

References

External links

Moths described in 1938
senex